Malone RFC (Malone Rugby Football Club) is a rugby union club based in Belfast, in Northern Ireland. It is currently in the Division 1B of the All-Ireland League. The club is affiliated with the Ulster Branch, itself part of the Irish Rugby Football Union. It is one of the last remaining Belfast rugby clubs not to have amalgamated and still plays at its original ground. As well as its successful Senior teams, it has a thriving Youth and Mini structure, and was the first Mini rugby team from Ireland to play in the renowned Fundacion Cisneros International rugby tournament in Madrid.

History

Malone Football Club was founded in 1892 by residents of Malone Park, Belfast. In 1896 Malone obtained senior status after two victories in the junior league. Malone first played a non-Irish side when it hosted Furness in 1903. The current name Malone Rugby Football Club was adopted in 1932. Malone moved to its present location in Gibson Park, Belfast in 1935, eventually purchasing it in 1953. The present clubhouse dates from 1967. The club hosted games from the 2007 Under 19 Rugby World Championship.

Honours
Ulster Senior Cup: 7
 1903-04, 1904–05, 1906–07, 1970–71, 1983–84, 1987–88, 1991–92
Ulster Senior League: 6
 1903-04, 1904–05, 1905–06, 1906–07, 1968–69, 1992–93
Ulster Junior Cup: 5
 †1931-32, †1967-68, †1974-75, †1977-78, †1980-81
All-Ireland League Division 2A :1
 2017-2018

† Won by 2nd XV

Distinguished Players
Approximately 28 Malone players have played for Ireland, and 6 of those were British & Irish Lions. Malone players have played international rugby in each decade since the start of the Twentieth Century. Data below is as of May 2009.
 John Hewitt Ferris (?1875-1903), Scrum Half. Ireland, 3 caps (1900). 
 Alfred Tedford (1877-1942), Forward. Ireland, 23 caps,(1902-1908), 6 Tries. British Isles, 1903 British Lions tour to South Africa, 3 caps.
 Reg W Edwards (1882-1913), Forward. Ireland, 1 cap (1904). British Isles, 1904 British Lions tour to Australia and New Zealand.
 Hugh Gilmer Wilson (1879-1941), Forward. Ireland, 18 caps, (1905-1910).
 George McIldowie (1886-1953), Forward. Ireland, 4 caps, (1906-1910), 1 Try.
 R(ichard?) E(dwin?) Forbes (1880-?), Forward. Ireland, 1 cap (1907).
 Tom Smyth (1884-1924), Prop. Ireland, 14 caps, (1908-1912), 2 Tries. British Isles (captain) 1910 British Lions tour to South Africa.
 William Victor Edwards (1887-1917), Forward. Ireland, 2 caps, (1912).
 William Ernest Crawford (1891-1959), Fullback. Ireland, 30 caps, (1920-1927), 6 conversions and 2 penalties.
 Norman G Ross (?1904-), No. 8. Ireland, 2 caps, (1927).
 Blair Mayne (1915-1955), Lock. Ireland, 6 caps,(1937-1939), 1 Try. Lions 1938 British Lions tour to South Africa, 3 caps.
 Jack Deryck Erle Monteith (1922-1992), Centre. Ireland, 3 caps, (1947).
 Ernest Strathdee (1921-1971), Scrum Half. Ireland, 9 caps (1947-1949).
 Robert D Agar (1920-), No. 8. Ireland, 10 caps (1947-1950).
 Jimmy E Nelson (1921-2014), Lock. Ireland, 16 caps, (1947-1954). Lions 1950 British Lions tour to New Zealand and Australia, 4 caps.
 Dennis Scott (1933-), Flanker. Ireland, 3 caps, (1961-1962).
 Aidan Malachy Brady (1939-), Hooker. Ireland: 4 caps, (1966-1968).
 Sam A Hutton (1940-), Prop. Ireland, 4 caps, (1967).
 William J Brown (1943-), Wing. Ireland, 4 caps, (1970), 1 Try.
 Willie Duncan (1957-), Flanker. Ireland, 2 caps (1984).
 John P McDonald (1960-), Hooker. Ireland, 4 caps (1987-1990).
 W Denis McBride (1964-), Flanker. Ireland, 32 caps, (1988-1997), 4 Tries.
 Colin R Wilkinson (1961-), Fullback. Ireland, 1 cap (1993).
 Maurice Field (1964-), Centre, Ireland 17 caps (1994-1997).
 Neil Best (1979-),Flanker. Ireland, 18 caps, (2005-2007), 2 Tries.
 Tom Court (1980-), Prop. Ireland, 9 caps (2008-).
 Simon Danielli, (1979-), Wing. Scotland, 24 caps (2003-), 6 Tries.
 Chris Henry (1984-), Flanker. Ireland, 11 caps (2010-), 1 Try.
 Paul Emerick (2003-), Centre/Wing, USA, 37 caps, 10 Tries.

References

External links
 Google Maps Satellite View of Malone RFC
 Malone RFC

Rugby union clubs in Northern Ireland
Irish rugby union teams
Sports clubs in Belfast
Rugby clubs established in 1892
Senior Irish rugby clubs (Ulster)
Rugby union clubs in County Antrim
1892 establishments in Ireland